"Too Good" is a 2016 song by Drake featuring Rihanna.

Too Good may also refer to:

 "Too Good", a song by Arlo Parks from the 2021 album Collapsed in Sunbeams
 "Too Good", a 1960 song by Little Tony

See also
 So Good (disambiguation)
 Too Good to Be True (disambiguation)